The year 1990 is the 2nd year in the history of Shooto, a mixed martial arts promotion based in the Japan. In 1990 Shooto held 6 events beginning with, Shooto: Shooto.

Title fights

Events list

Shooto: Shooto
Shooto: Shooto was an event held on January 13, 1990, at Korakuen Hall in Tokyo, Japan.

Results

Shooto: Shooto
Shooto: Shooto was an event held on March 17, 1990, at Korakuen Hall in Tokyo, Japan.

Results

Shooto: Shooto
Shooto: Shooto was an event held on May 12, 1990, at Korakuen Hall in Tokyo, Japan.

Results

Shooto: Shooto
Shooto: Shooto was an event held on July 7, 1990, at Korakuen Hall in Tokyo, Japan.

Results

Shooto: Shooto
Shooto: Shooto was an event held on September 8, 1990, at Korakuen Hall in Tokyo, Japan.

Results

Shooto: Shooto
Shooto: Shooto was an event held on November 28, 1990, at Korakuen Hall in Tokyo, Japan.

Results

See also
 Shooto
 List of Shooto champions
 List of Shooto Events

References

Shooto events
1990 in mixed martial arts